Glossopdale is the area around Glossop, Derbyshire, England, the valley of the Glossop Brook.

It includes Glossop, Hadfield, Charlesworth, Dinting, Dinting Vale, Higher Dinting, Padfield, Old Glossop, Whitfield, Derbyshire and Gamesley

See also
List of places in Derbyshire

External links
Book "Longdendale and Glossopdale" compiled by Bill Johnson
PDF on the Glossopdale Townscape Heritage Initiative Area

Geography of Derbyshire
Glossop
High Peak, Derbyshire